Gazini Christiana Jordi Acopiado Ganados (born December 26, 1995) is a Filipino model and beauty pageant titleholder who was crowned Miss Universe Philippines 2019. She represented the Philippines at the Miss Universe 2019 pageant and finished as a Top 20 semifinalist along with the Best National Costume award.

Early life and education
Gazini Christiana Jordi Acopiado Ganados was born in Dapitan, Zamboanga del Norte, Philippines to a domestic partnership between her Palestinian father and Filipino mother who later separated. Ganados was raised by her maternal grandparents. Ganados and her family moved and have resided in the city of Talisay, Cebu since she was in sixth grade. She holds a degree in Tourism Management and a certificate in Health Care Services NCII both from the University of San Jose–Recoletos in Cebu City.

Pageantry

Miss World Philippines 2014

Ganados joined Miss World Philippines 2014 and placed in the Top 13. Valerie Weigmann won the said pageant.

Binibining Pilipinas 2019

On June 9, 2019, she competed in Binibining Pilipinas 2019 representing Talisay, Cebu and won the title of Miss Universe Philippines 2019.

Ganados is the second Cebuana to win the Binibining Pilipinas Universe title, after Pilar Pilapil who won in 1967. During the national costume competition, she wore an ensemble inspired by Queen Juana (queen consort of Rajah Humabon) of the ancient Rajahnate of Cebu, and the whole representation of the festivities and meaning of the Sinulog Festival in the whole island of Cebu. In honor of her Middle Eastern roots, she chose to perform a belly dance presentation during the talent competition. As she is very close to her grandparents, her main advocacy is elderly care. Ganados was crowned by outgoing Miss Universe Philippines 2018 and Miss Universe 2018, Catriona Gray.

Ganados won the following special awards:
Best in Long Gown
Face of Binibini (Miss Photogenic)

During the question and answer portion of the national pageant, she was asked: "If you win the crown tonight, what can you do to get more women in the workplace?" She replied:

On October 25, 2020, Ganados crowned Rabiya Mateo as her successor at the Miss Universe Philippines 2020 pageant held at Cordillera Convention Hall, Baguio Country Club in Baguio, Benguet.

Miss Universe 2019

As Miss Universe Philippines 2019, Ganados represented the Philippines at the Miss Universe 2019 pageant on December 8, 2019, at the Tyler Perry Studios in Atlanta, Georgia, United States.

At the national costume competition, Ganados wore a Philippine eagle-inspired ensemble with two life-sized birds on each shoulder. The creation was hand-stitched with laser-cut patterns.

At the preliminary competition, Ganados introduced herself and her country wearing a lavender halter-neck gown designed by Sherri Hill. She debuted her 'phoenix' walk wearing a black tropical-print bikini with a bright yellow cape at the preliminary swimsuit competition. She wore a golden gilded gown designed by the Cebu-based couturier, Cary Santiago at the preliminary evening gown competition. It was a reminiscent of the pink gown she wore when she won the Miss Universe Philippines 2019 title at the Binibining Pilipinas 2019 pageant.

At the coronation night, she advanced to the Top 20 as one of the wildcards. At the opening statement segment, she expressed:"The world is aging, and my grandparents raised me. I worked in an organization that was supporting elderly care. I learned... I realized that there's this stigma between ageism, poverty, exclusivity, and invincibility. It is rightful for us to remember that they were the ones who paved the way for us. We should reciprocrate that love, and no one should be ever left behind. Thank you."

Ganados concluded her Miss Universe journey by finishing as a Top 20 semifinalist along with the Best in National Costume award. Zozibini Tunzi of South Africa won the said pageant.

See also 
Binibining Pilipinas
Binibining Pilipinas 2019
Bea Magtanong

References

External links
Binibining Pilipinas Official Website

1995 births
Living people
Binibining Pilipinas winners
Filipino people of Palestinian descent
Miss Universe 2019 contestants
Miss World Philippines contestants
People from Talisay, Cebu
People from Zamboanga del Norte
Cebuano beauty pageant winners